Eosiren is an extinct genus of sea cow that lived during the Late Eocene (later Priabonian) to Early Oligocene (Rupelian). Several fossils have been found in Egypt. It seems like the species E. abeli were contemporaneous with Protosiren and Eotheroides. like them, Eosiren closely resembled modern sirenians. It differes from them by having somewhat larger innominates and possess thigh bones.

Eosiren was first described by vertebrage paleontologist Charles William Andrews in 1902, who distinguished it from the genus Halitherium due to differences in the teeth and mandible. Later that year, Science published a summary of his findings in a collection on advances in zoopaleontology.

References

Eocene sirenians
Eocene mammals of Africa
Prehistoric placental genera
Taxa named by Othenio Abel
Fossil taxa described in 1913